Nathan Cole Jr. (1860–1921) was one of the two founders of the Los Angeles Daily  Times, now the Los Angeles Times. The son of Nathan Cole, a wealthy St. Louis, Missouri, politician and banker, he was 21 years old in 1881 when he and a colleague, Thomas Gardiner, put together the first issues of the new venture to be printed on the presses of the Mirror Publishing Company. Later he was a real estate man and a Los Angeles city police commissioner.

Cole worked on a St. Louis newspaper, then traveled west to Portland, Oregon, and to Woodland, California. He came to Los Angeles specifically to start a newspaper, which ran into financial difficulty and was taken over by General Harrison Gray Otis in 1882. Cole returned to St. Louis, where he went into business with his father, Nathan Cole, who had been a U.S. Representative in Congress and Mayor of St. Louis. Cole  soon returned to Los Angeles, where he remained until he died on December 7, 1921.

Cole began his Los Angeles career as a Republican editing a Republican newspaper, but he switched to the Democrats and became a leader of the local party. He was a Democratic committeeman in the first presidential election campaign of Woodrow Wilson. Cole was an early member of the Jonathan Club and was a Mason and a member of the Sons of the Revolution. He was appointed to the police commission by Mayor Arthur C. Harper.

Cole was survived by his wife and by two daughters, Gladys Cole and Mrs. R.L. McCrea, and by sons Nathan and Richard H.

See also

 List of Los Angeles Times publishers

References

External links
 "The Times' 128-Year History," Los Angeles Times Media Group
 Photograph of Nathan Cole Jr., holding a top hat, about age 20, in the USC Digital Library

1860 births
1921 deaths
19th-century American newspaper publishers (people)
Businesspeople from Los Angeles
Businesspeople from St. Louis
California Republicans
California Democrats